WFKN (1220 AM) is a radio station broadcasting a country music format. Licensed to Franklin, Kentucky, United States. The station is currently owned by the Paxton Media Group through WFKN, LLC, and features programming from Cumulus Media Networks' "Best Country Today" network. The station shares ownership with Franklin's local paper, the weekly Franklin Favorite.

References

External links

FKN
Franklin, Kentucky
Country radio stations in Kentucky